Acrochordonichthys chamaeleon is a species of catfish of the family Akysidae.

This species is endemic to Indonesia and is only known from the Kapuas River drainage, West Kalimantan (Borneo).

References

Akysidae
Endemic fauna of Borneo
Freshwater fish of Borneo
Fish described in 1902